Whitton Methodist Church was a Methodist church on Percy Road, Whitton in the London Borough of Richmond upon Thames.

A hall at the church was badly damaged in a fire on 13 September 2015.

The church held its last service on 18 July 2021.

References

External links
 Location of the church on Streetmap

1938 establishments in England
Churches in Whitton, London
Methodist churches in the London Borough of Richmond upon Thames